One human poll makes up the 2014 National Association of Intercollegiate Athletics (NAIA) football rankings, sometimes called the NAIA Coaches' Poll or the football ratings.  When the regular season is complete, the NAIA plans to sponsor a playoff to determine the year's national champion.  A final poll will be taken after completion of the 2014 NAIA Football National Championship.

Poll release dates
The poll release dates are scheduled to be:

Week by week rankings

Leading Vote-Getters
Since the inception of the Coaches' Poll in 1999, the #1 ranking in the various weekly polls has been held by only a select group of teams.  Through the end of 2014, the team and the number of times they have held the #1 weekly ranking are shown below.  The number of times a team has been ranked #1 in the postseason poll (the national champion) is shown in parentheses.

In 1999, the results of a postseason poll, if one was conducted, are not known.  Therefore, an additional poll was presumed, and the #1 postseason ranking has been credited to the postseason tournament champion, the Northwestern Oklahoma State Rangers.

References

Rankings
NAIA football rankings